Huda Polica is a small settlement in the hills south of Šmarje–Sap in the Municipality of Grosuplje  in central Slovenia. The area is part of the historical region of Lower Carniola. The municipality is now included in the Central Slovenia Statistical Region.

References

External links

Huda Polica on Geopedia

Populated places in the Municipality of Grosuplje